The 1939 Baylor Bears football team represented Baylor University in the Southwest Conference (SWC) during the 1939 college football season. In their 14th season under head coach Morley Jennings, the Bears compiled a 7–3 record (4–2 against conference opponents), tied for second place in the conference, and outscored opponents by a combined total of 136 to 81. They played their home games at Waco Stadium in Waco, Texas. Bobby R. Taylor was the team captain.

Schedule

References

Baylor
Baylor Bears football seasons
Baylor Bears football